The Fishermaid of Ballydavid is a 1911 American silent film produced by Kalem Company. It was directed by Sidney Olcott with himself and Gene Gauntier in the leading roles.

Cast

Production notes
The film was shot in Ireland, in Ballydavid, co Kerry and in Howth, co Dublin, during summer 1911.

References
 Michel Derrien, Aux origines du cinéma irlandais: Sidney Olcott, le premier oeil, TIR 2013.

External links

 The Fishermaid of Ballydavid website dedicated to Sidney Olcott

1911 films
Silent American drama films
American silent short films
Films shot in Ireland
Films set in Ireland
Films directed by Sidney Olcott
1911 short films
1911 drama films
American black-and-white films
1910s American films